Encaumaptera stigmata is a moth in the family Cossidae, and the only species in the genus Encaumaptera. It is found in India.

References

Natural History Museum Lepidoptera generic names catalog

Metarbelinae
Moths described in 1893